In molecular biology, the protein domain Stirrup is a domain, found only in found in the domain, archaea. The Stirrup protein domain is found in prokaryotic protein ribonucleotide reductases. It obtains its name due to its resemblance to an old fashioned Japanese stirrup. Stirrip has a molecular mass of 9 kDa and is folded into an alpha/beta structure. It allows for binding of the reductase to DNA via electrostatic interactions, since it has a predominance of positive charges distributed on its surface.

Function 
This protein domain provides the precursors necessary for DNA synthesis. It catalyses the biosynthesis of DNA from RNA.

Structure 

This structure contains a three-stranded beta-sheet to the solvent, which lies against alpha-helices.

References 

Protein domains
Archaea biology
Protein families